John Seebohm (born 6 April 1960) is a former Australian rules footballer who played for the Glenelg Football Club in the South Australian National Football League.

Playing career
Regarded as a quiet achiever, Seebohm is one of only three footballers to have played over 300 senior League matches for Glenelg (the other two being Peter Carey and David Marshall). He was a versatile mid-sized player who played much of his career at centre half-back but also excelled in attack, being named at full-forward in the 1986 premiership side and kicking 89 goals in 1987.

Personal 
Seebohm and his wife Karen, a netballer and swimming instructor, are the parents of four children, including their only daughter, Olympic swimmer Emily Seebohm.

References

External Links

Glenelg Football Club players
1960 births
Living people